Caritas Internationalis is a confederation of 162 Catholic relief, development and social service organizations operating in over 200 countries and territories worldwide.

Collectively and individually, their missions are to work to build a better world, especially for the poor and oppressed. The first Caritas organization was established by Lorenz Werthmann on 9 November 1897 in Freiburg (headquarters for Germany). Other national Caritas organizations were soon formed in Switzerland (1901) and the United States (Catholic Charities, 1910).

History

In July 1924, during the international Eucharistic Congress in Amsterdam, 60 delegates from 22 countries formed a conference, with headquarters at Caritas Switzerland in Luzern. In 1928, the conference became known as Caritas Catholica. The delegates met every two years until the outbreak of the Second World War when all activities came to a standstill. Work resumed in 1947, with the approval of the Secretariat of State, and two conferences were convened in Luzern to help coordinate efforts and collaboration.

Caritas was given a further endorsement when the Secretariat of State entrusted it with the official representation of all welfare organizations at the international level, especially at the United Nations. The Holy Year in 1950 saw the beginning of a union of Caritas organizations. Following a suggestion by Monsignor Montini, then Substitute Secretary of State, and later Pope Paul VI, a study week, with participants from 22 countries, was held in Rome to examine the problems of Christian Caritas work. As a result, the decision was made to set up an international conference of Roman Catholic charities.

In December 1951, upon approval of the statutes by the Holy See, the first constitutive General Assembly of Caritas Internationalis took place. Founding members came from Caritas organizations in 13 countries: Austria, Belgium, Canada, Denmark, France, Germany, Netherlands, Italy, Luxembourg, Portugal, Spain, Switzerland, and the United States. The Church describes Caritas as its official voice “in relation to its teachings in the area of charity work”.

In 1954, the Confederation changed its name to Caritas Internationalis to reflect the international presence of Caritas members on every continent. As of 2015, the Confederation has 164 members working in over 200 countries and territories. Its General Secretariat is located in the Palazzo San Callisto, Vatican City. The current president is Luis Antonio Cardinal Tagle and the Secretary General is Aloysius John.

After World War Two, Caritas was implicated in assisting Franz Stangl, a supervisor at the Hartheim Euthanasia Centre which was the early Nazi euthanasia programme responsible for the deaths of over 70,000 mentally ill or physically deformed people in Germany, in his escape to Syria. After Stangl made his way to Rome from Linz, the Caritas relief agency provided him with a Red Cross passport and a boat ticket to Syria.

Caritas national and regional agencies

The full membership list of Caritas organizations includes:

Africa
Including 45 national agencies in Sub-Saharan Africa:
 Algeria – Caritas Algérie. The Catholic Church in Algeria announced on September 27, 2022, the unprecedented closure of Caritas. Open since 1962, it will cease its activities from October 1.
 Chad – SECADEV (Caritas Chad) has partnered with the Canadian bishops' Development and Peace program to provide essential aid for Sudanese refugees in Chad, including access to water, financing for small businesses and agricultural projects.
 Egypt - Caritas Egypt (part of a Middle East and Africa (MENA) regional agency), founded and recognised by the Egyptian government in 1967.
 Kenya – Caritas Nairobi - operated by the Archdiocese of Nairobi
 Nigeria – Caritas Nigeria claims to work with local diocesan Caritas to bring relief to displaced families in the North East region displaced because of attacks by Boko Haram.
 Uganda – Caritas Uganda (founded in 1970)

Asia

24 national agencies including:
 Nepal – Caritas Nepal
 Bangladesh – Caritas Bangladesh Governed by The Catholic Bishops' Conference of Bangladesh
 Cambodia – Caritas Cambodia
 Hong Kong – Caritas Hong Kong operated by the Catholic Diocese of Hong Kong
 Indonesia – Caritas Indonesia – KARINA
 Myanmar   - caritas Myanmar  -(KARUNA MISSION SOCIAL SOLIDARITY) OR KARUNA MYANMAR 
 Caritas Bandung – operated by the Diocese of Bandung
 Cordia Caritas Medan – operated by Archdiocese of Medan
 Caritas Keuskupan Sibolga – operated by Roman Catholic Diocese of Sibolga
 Caritas Keuskupan Agung Semarang – Karina KAS – operated by Archdiocese of Semarang
 Caritas Tanjungkarang – operated by the Roman Catholic Diocese of Tanjungkarang
 India – Caritas India claimed in its Decennial Report that the organization invested US$75 million on 14 major emergencies across the country during 2014–2015 period.  
 Japan – Caritas Japan
 Korea – Caritas Korea
 Macau – Caritas de Macau – established the Family Casework & Assistance Service, Our Lady of Mt. Carmel Home for the Elderly, St. Luis Gonzaga Center for the Disabled and Institute of Social Work, the first Institute in Macau offering training for social workers.
 Mongolia – Caritas Mongolia
 Philippines – National Secretariat on Social Action/Caritas Philippines (NASSA/Caritas Philippines)
 Caritas Manila – Focus on Education, Health, and Disaster Risk Reduction and Management as flagship programs. Operated by the Archdiocese of Manila.
 Singapore – Caritas Singapore
 Vietnam – Caritas Việt Nam (26 members of the diocesan)
 MENA regional agency Caritas MENA with 17 national agencies including:
 Cyprus
 Jordan – Caritas Jordan has taken part in efforts to support displaced Syrians since December 2011 and is still active in addressing the needs of refugees.
 Lebanon – Caritas Lebanon works through different centers throughout the country, delivering food parcels, hygiene kits and blankets to refugee families from war-torn Syria. There is also medical assistance through mobile clinics and health centers.
 Syria

Europe

Caritas Europa with 48 national agencies including:
 Armenia – Armenian Caritas
 Austria – Caritas Österreich
 Belgium – Caritas Catholica Belgica
 Bosnia and Herzegovina – Caritas Republic of Bosnia and Herzegovina
 Bulgaria – Caritas Bulgaria
 Croatia – Caritas Republic of Croatia
 Czech Republic – Charita Česká republika
 Denmark – Caritas Danmark
 England and Wales – where there are two Caritas agencies: CAFOD and Caritas – Social Action
 Estonia – Caritas Estonia
 Finland – Suomen Caritas ry
 France – where the Caritas agency is Secours catholique
 Georgia – Caritas Georgia
 Germany – Caritas Deutschland
 Greece – Κάριτας Ελλάς
 Hungary – Katolikus Karitász
 Iceland – Caritas Iceland
 Ireland – where the Caritas agency is Trócaire
 Italy – Caritas Italiana
 Latvia – Caritas Latvija
 Lithuania – Caritas Lithuania
 Luxembourg – Caritas Luxembourg
 Malta – Caritas Malta
 Moldova – Caritas Moldova
 Netherlands – where the Caritas agency is CORDAID

 Norway – Caritas Norge
 Poland – Caritas Polska
 Portugal – Caritas Portugal
 Romania – Confederația Caritas România
 Russia – Caritas in the European part of Russia
 Scotland – where the Caritas agency is SCIAF
 Serbia – Caritas Republic of Serbia
 Slovakia – Slovenská katolícka charita
 Slovenia – Slovenska Karitas
 Spain – Cáritas Española
 Sweden – Caritas Sverige
 Switzerland – Caritas Switzerland
 Ukraine –  (Caritas Ukraine), with over 30 regional organisations operating across Ukraine

North America, Central America and the Caribbean
 Antillas
 Canada – Development and Peace (Caritas Canada)
 Costa Rica
 Cuba – Caritas Cuba
 Dominican Republic
 El Salvador – Caritas El Salvador
 Guatemala – Caritas Guatemala
 Haiti
 Honduras
 Mexico – Caritas Mexico
 Nicaragua
 Panamá
 Puerto Rico
 United States – Catholic Relief Services, Catholic Charities USA, Caritas USA, formerly Caritas Christi Health Care

Oceania
Six regional agencies, including:
 Australia – Caritas Australia claims involvement in peacebuilding and reconciliation programs in Brazil, Sri Lanka, The Philippines, Papua New Guinea and elsewhere.
 New Zealand – Caritas Aotearoa New Zealand
 Papua New Guinea – Caritas PNG
  Caritas Samoa claims to give assistance to low income families, provides capacity-building initiatives for women, help with the improvement of rural waters supplies, and provides assistance to address needs caused by natural disasters.

South America
 Argentina – Caritas Argentina
 Bolivia – Caritas de Bolivia
 Brasil – Caritas Brasil
 Chile – Caritas Chile
 Colombia- Caritas Colombiana 
 Ecuador – Caritas de Ecuador
 Peru – Caritas Perú
 Uruguay – Caritas Uruguay
 Venezuela – Caritas de Venezuela

See also
 Christian humanitarian aid
 Catholic social teaching
 Church asylum
 Fidesco International
 Catholic Relief Services

References

External links
 Caritas Internationalis
 Caritas Catholica Belgica in ODIS - Online Database for Intermediary Structures  
 Archives of Caritas Catholica Belgica in ODIS - Online Database for Intermediary Structures  
 Archives of Caritas Catholica Flanders in ODIS - Online Database for Intermediary Structures 

 
Religious organizations established in 1897
Catholic charities
International Christian organizations
International charities
Development charities
Humanitarian aid organizations
Social welfare charities
Christian relief organizations